Ludus Tonalis ("Play of Tones", "Tonal Game", or "Tonal Primary School" after the Latin Ludus Litterarius), subtitled Kontrapunktische, tonale, und Klaviertechnische Übungen (Counterpoint, tonal and technical studies for the piano), is a piano work by Paul Hindemith that was composed in 1942 during his stay in the United States. It was first performed in 1943 in Chicago by Willard MacGregor. The piece explores "matters of technique, theory, inspiration, and communication. It is in effect, a veritable catalogue of the composer's mature style."

The piece, which comprises all 12 major and/or minor keys, starts with a three-part Praeludium in C resembling Johann Sebastian Bach's toccatas, and ends with a Postludium which is an exact retrograde inversion of the Praeludium.  In between, there are twelve three-part fugues separated by eleven interludes, beginning in the tonality of the previous fugue and ending in the tonality of the next fugue (or in a different tonality very close to that).  The tonalities of the fugues follow the order of his Serie 1 and use the keynote C (see The Craft of Musical Composition).

Ludus Tonalis was intended to be the twentieth-century equivalent to J.S. Bach's The Well-Tempered Clavier.  Unlike Bach's work, though, the non-fugal pieces in Ludus Tonalis frequently repeat the work's main theme.

Ludus Tonalis can be thought of as the most direct application of Hindemith's theory that the twelve tones of the equally tempered scale all relate to a single one of them (called a tonic or keynote).  The affinity of each note with the keynote is directly related to its position on the harmonic scale. In this system, the major-minor duality is meaningless and the practice of modulation is dropped, although subject modulation occurs in the second fugue, to create growing tension.

Structure

Ludus Tonalis consists of 25 movements:

 Praeludium. Partly in C (mm. 1–32) and partly in F (mm. 34–47)
 Fuga prima in C: Triple fugue
 Interludium: Romantic improvisation
 Fuga secunda in G: Dance in  time
 Interludium: Pastorale
 Fuga tertia in F: Mirror fugue, where the second half is an exact retrograde of the first, except with voice paddings at their end exits.
 Interludium: Folk dance (Gavotte)
 Fuga quarta in A: Double fugue
 Interludium: Baroque prelude
 Fuga quinta in E: Gigue
 Interludium: Romantic miniature (Chopin style)
 Fuga sexta in E: Rococo style
 Interludium: March 
 Fuga septima in A: Romantic style
 Interludium: Romantic miniature (Brahms style)
 Fuga octava in D: Dance in  time (though notated in )
 Interludium: Baroque toccata
 Fuga nona in B: Subject transformation fugue
 Interludium: Pastorale
 Fuga decima in D: Inversion fugue
 Interludium: Folk dance (Courante)
 Fuga undecima in B (canon): Accompanied canon
 Interludium: Romantic waltz
 Fuga duodecima in F: Stretto fugue
 Postludium: Retrograde inversion of the Praeludium.

There is a striking symmetry around the center of the cycle (the march).

References

External links

Compositions for solo piano
Compositions by Paul Hindemith
Preludes (music)
Fugues
1942 compositions
Hindemith